Radnor may refer to:

Places

United Kingdom 
 Radnorshire, a county of Wales until 1974, commonly known as Radnor
 Radnor (district), a district of Powys, Wales between 1974 and 1989
 New Radnor, a village in Powys, Wales
 Old Radnor, a town in Powys, Wales
 Radnor Forest, a rock dome in Mid Wales

United States 
 Radnor, Indiana
 Radnor, Ohio
 Radnor, Pennsylvania
 Radnor Lake State Natural Area, Nashville, Tennessee

People with the surname
 Josh Radnor (born 1974), American actor

Other uses 
 Earl of Radnor, an English peerage
 Hill Radnor, a breed of domestic sheep 
 Radnor, a fictional character in the strategy game Dune II
 Radnor Drinks, a Welsh brand of bottled drinks famous for their school-compliant soft drinks.

See also
 Radnor Township (disambiguation)
 Radner